Ananthasayanam is a 1972 Indian Malayalam film, directed and produced by K. Suku. The film stars Sheela, Jayabharathi, Adoor Bhasi and Prema in the lead roles. The film had musical score by K. Raghavan.

Cast

Sheela
Jayabharathi
Adoor Bhasi
Prema
T. R. Omana
Mancheri Chandran
Bahadoor
K. P. Ummer
Kottarakkara Sreedharan Nair
Meena
N. Govindankutty
Nellikode Bhaskaran
Radhamani
Raghava Menon
Sujatha
Thodupuzha Radhakrishnan
Chandramohan

Soundtrack
The music was composed by K. Raghavan and the lyrics were written by Sreekumaran Thampi.

References

External links
 

1972 films
1970s Malayalam-language films